Count Walram IV of Nassau-Idstein (1354 – 7 November 1393) was a younger son of Count Adolph I of Nassau-Wiesbaden-Idstein and his wife Margaret of Nuremberg.  He inherited Nassau-Idstein when his father died in 1370.  When his brother Gerlach II died in 1386, he also inherited Nassau-Wiesbaden.

Marriage and issue 
He married Bertha, the daughter of Count John I of Westerburg.  They had two children:
 Margaret (b. 1380), married in 1398 to Count Henry VII of Waldeck
 Adolph II (1386–1426), his successor

Counts of Nassau
1354 births
1393 deaths
14th-century German nobility